Lukas Raeder (born 30 December 1993) is a German professional footballer who plays as a goalkeeper for MSV Duisburg.

Club career

Early career
Raeder was at Essener SV, ESC Rellinghausen 06, MSV Duisburg, Rot-Weiss Essen, and Schalke 04 during his youth team career.

Bayern Munich
Raeder joined Bayern Munich in 2012 from Schalke 04. He made his Bundesliga debut at 12 April 2014 in a 3–0 home defeat against Borussia Dortmund. He replaced Manuel Neuer at half-time. He conceded two goals. He then started in the DFB–Pokal semi-final against 1. FC Kaiserslautern, which his team won 5–1.

Vitória Setúbal
On 7 July 2014, Raeder signed for Portuguese club Vitória Setúbal on a three-year contract.

Bradford City
He joined Bradford City on a short-term deal on 31 August 2017. He was released by Bradford City at the end of the 2017–18 season.

Lokomotiv Plovdiv
In July 2021, Raeder signed a two-year contract with Bulgarian club Lokomotiv Plovdiv.

MSV Duisburg
In 2022, he came back to Germany and signed for MSV Duisburg.

Career statistics

Honours
Bayern Munich
 Bundesliga: 2013–14
 DFB-Pokal: 2013–14
 FIFA Club World Cup: 2013

References

External links

1993 births
Living people
Footballers from Essen
Association football goalkeepers
German footballers
FC Bayern Munich footballers
FC Bayern Munich II players
Rot-Weiss Essen players
Vitória F.C. players
VfB Lübeck players
Bradford City A.F.C. players
PFC Lokomotiv Plovdiv players
MSV Duisburg players
Bundesliga players
3. Liga players
Regionalliga players
Primeira Liga players
English Football League players
First Professional Football League (Bulgaria) players
German expatriate footballers
Expatriate footballers in Bulgaria
Expatriate footballers in England
Expatriate footballers in Portugal
German expatriate sportspeople in Bulgaria
German expatriate sportspeople in England
German expatriate sportspeople in Portugal